The 1956 United States presidential election in Iowa took place on November 6, 1956, as part of the 1956 United States presidential election. Iowa voters chose ten representatives, or electors, to the Electoral College, who voted for president and vice president.

Iowa was won by incumbent President Dwight D. Eisenhower (R–Pennsylvania), running with Vice President Richard Nixon, with 59.06% of the popular vote, against Adlai Stevenson (D–Illinois), running with Senator Estes Kefauver, with 40.65% of the popular vote. Iowa’s result weighed in as exactly 3% more Republican than the nation-at-large. Eisenhower carried every county except for Wapello County; this would be the last time a Republican presidential candidate won Dubuque County until Donald Trump in 2016.

Results

Results by county

See also
 United States presidential elections in Iowa

Notes

References

Iowa
1956
1956 Iowa elections